Peter Carl Minack (born in 1961 or 1962) is an Australian teacher of English. He was known by his stage name Ron Hitler-Barassi when he was the vocalist for the alternative rock band TISM between 1983 and 2004. Under his own name he published an American Civil War novel, C.W.G. (or Campaigning with Grant) in 2000. While a member of TISM, Minack periodically worked as a secondary school teacher of English and fully resumed that role after they disbanded. In 2022, TISM reformed.

Biography 

Minack was born to a German father and Irish Australian mother in Richmond in 1961 or 1962.

In 1983, he joined TISM, an alternative rock band formed by two of his friends, Damian Cowell and Eugene Cester, in the year before. TISM members remained anonymous throughout their career, with Minack adopting his stage name, Ron Hitler-Barassi, as a reference to his German background and Australian rules football fandom.

In 2000 he published a historical novel set in the American Civil War, C.W.G. or more fully, Campaigning with Grant. Michelle Griffin of The Age reviewed it as "anarchic and anachronistic" with a "sour satiric tone" where leaders of the conflict are cast as "civil war dickheads" to be "frequently lampooned throughout." The Weekend Australians Stephen Matchett described it as "a terrific book that deserved the critical admiration it received."

TISM split up at the end of 2004 and Minack returned to his day job as a secondary school teacher of English in Melbourne. 

In 2022, TISM reformed, to play three shows at the Goodthings festival, and 3 secret shows around Melbourne.

References

Australian male singers
Australian poets
Australian people of German descent
Australian people of Irish descent
TISM
1960s births
Living people